Death Chorus is the fourth and final full-length studio album from upstate New York-based post-hardcore/punk rock band Polar Bear Club, released in 2013 through Rise Records. "Blood Balloon" and "Upstate Mosquito" were released as singles. In October and November, the band supported Taking Back Sunday on their headlining US tour. In November and December, the band went on tour with Citizen, Diamond Youth and Sainthood Reps.

Track listing

Personnel
Polar Bear Club
 Jimmy Stadt - vocals
 Chris Browne - guitar, backing vocals
 Pat Benson - guitar
 Tyler Smith - bass
 Steve Port - drums

Production
 Will Yip - Production, Engineer, Mixing

References

2013 albums
Polar Bear Club albums
Rise Records albums
Albums produced by Will Yip